Queensbury Union Free School District is a public school district that serves Queensbury, New York with 4 schools all on the same campus.

About
QUFSD had 3,349 students in the 2015-2016 academic year with 258 teachers and 493 total staff members.

List of schools

Elementary school
Queensbury Elementary School
William H. Barton Intermediate School

Middle schools
Queensbury Middle School

High schools
Queensbury High School

References 

Education in Warren County, New York
School districts in New York (state)
School districts established in 1950